Rock Hard (also RockHard) is a German music magazine published in Dortmund, with other language editions in various countries worldwide, including France, Spain, Brazil, Portugal, Italy and Greece. The magazine focuses on hard rock and heavy metal content, including reports, interviews, specials, reviews and news.

Next to the German edition of Metal Hammer, it is the leading magazine for metal and hard rock in Germany. Founded by Holger Stratmann, more than 300 issues have been published in Germany since 1983; it has been published monthly since 1989. Rock Hard magazine is independent from major media companies. Its slogan is "critical, competent, independent". Since 1990, magazine employees have also organized the Rock Hard Festival, which has been held annually in Gelsenkirchen on the Pentecost weekend since 2003. The festival is streamed by news magazine Spiegel Online, the internet edition of Der Spiegel, and by WDR television under the Rockpalast label.

Götz Kühnemund was editor-in-chief of Rock Hard from 1990 until January 2014, when he and some other editors had to leave the magazine due to financial needs and creative differences with the magazine's founder and publisher Holger Stratmann. Kühnemund, who is a well-known figure not only in the German metal scene, was known for his efforts to preserve what he called "real heavy metal" instead of going more commercial, opening the magazine to influences from different metal substyles. Kühnemund's departure was compared to "the pope leaving the church". Kühnemund then founded a new magazine called Deaf Forever. Boris Kaiser and Michael Rensen became the new editors-in-chief in a dual leadership. Since February 2016, only Boris Kaiser is editor-in-chief, while Michael Rensen works as an editor again.

Rock Hard has its own music streaming channel on the internet video portal Putpat.tv. It also publishes its own mobile app in addition to the magazine which is available on iTunes and Google Play. This development was due to the falling sales of the printed magazine, a phenomenon which has affected all music press in Germany in recent years and also forced Rock Hard to "concentrate on the core business", using the online sector for marketing and additional services.

Further reading
 Holger Schmenk, Christian Krumm: Kumpels in Kutten. Heavy Metal im Ruhrgebiet, 1st ed., Henselowsky + Boschmann, Bottrop 2010, .

References

External links
Rock Hard official site
Rock Hard Festival official site

Music magazines published in Germany
Heavy metal publications
Monthly magazines published in Germany
Magazines established in 1983
1983 establishments in Germany
Mass media in Dortmund
German-language magazines